Mónica Antich (born 31 August 1966) is a former synchronized swimmer from Spain. She competed in the women's solo and the women's duet at the 1984 Summer Olympics.

References 

1966 births
Living people
Spanish synchronized swimmers
Olympic synchronized swimmers of Spain
Synchronized swimmers at the 1984 Summer Olympics